The house at 81–83 Gardner Street is a historic house in the Newton Corner village of Newton, Massachusetts.  The -story duplex is remarkably well-preserved example of a vernacular worker's cottage, a style not often found in Newton but somewhat common in Newton Corner.  It has a side-gable roof and asymmetrically placed chimneys.  The house has a side (originally doubled) entry, and lacks any significant external architectural ornamentation.

The house was listed on the National Register of Historic Places in 1986.

See also
 National Register of Historic Places listings in Newton, Massachusetts

References

Houses on the National Register of Historic Places in Newton, Massachusetts
Houses completed in 1850